Wilson Karunaratne, popularly known as Wilson Karu (28 October 1942 – 3 May 2022) was an actor in Sri Lankan cinema, and stunt director. Considered one of the best villains in Sinhala cinema, Karunaratne acted in more than 240 films across many genres primarily as main antagonist.

Personal life
Wilson Karu was born on 28 October 1942 in Colombo, Sri Lanka as the second child of the family with four siblings. He had one elder brother, one younger sister and one younger brother. He completed education from Lumbini College, Colombo. During young ages, he played football, cricket, gymnastics, wrestling, judo and karate. Once he was selected to go to a football training camp in Pakistan, but he could not attend the camp as he fell from motor bike and broke the shoulder.

He never married and lived alone after the death of his parents. He died on 3 May 2022 at the age of 79. His remains were laid at Jayaratne parlour for public respect on 3 May 2022 and cremation took place at Kirulapone crematorium at 4 p.m on 4 May 2022.

Career
He had a long standing passion to be an actor star where he frequently went to the film halls to watch English and Sinhala films. A relative called Punya Bulathsinhala referred him to the director of the film Hadawath Naththo Subayar Makeem in 1974. Karunaratne made his maiden cinematic appearance through the 1974 film Hadawath Naththo as a stuntman. The first scenario was the fight with Robin Fernando at the Rubber Estate. He went missing from the films for about a year after Hadawath Naththo. After that, with the help of Karunadasa Perera, the then production manager of the films, Karu re-entered the film industry by joining the fight scenes in films such as Yakadaya, Hitha Mithura, Sankapali and Saradielge Putha directed by Neil Rupasinghe and Sarath Rupasinghe.

In 1987, he got a lead role in the film Kiwule Gedara Mohottala directed by Pathiraja L.S. Dayananda. In one scene in the film, he had to jump from a height of about 80 feet, where his spine hit a rock. Dr. Godagama Jayasinghe treated his spine for months. He continued to make several near-to-death moments during jumps, summersaults and scenes in moving trains and trucks in the films such as: Dinesh Priyasad's Demodara Palama, Malani Fonseka's Sasara Chethana, Cyril Weerasinghe's Anuradha, Preethiraj Weeraratne's Pudumai Eth Aththai, Ranjith Siriwardena's Yudha Gini Meda etc. He won a merit award for the role "Nicholas" in Fonseka's film Sasara Chethana.

With that he acted in more than 250 Sinhala films and 15 television serials particularly as the villain. Apart from cinema, he appeared in the television serials Thara Devi produced by Lucien Bulathsinhala and also in the serials Eranga and Ran Kahawanu. Meanwhile, he also worked as the stunt director in few films. In 2018 he appeared in the music video Danuna produced by Iraj Weeraratne, where the public later criticized his appearance for the life of popular singer Victor Rathnayake.

Arrest
In May 2020, Karu was arrest by the police due to obstruction of police duty in violation of quarantine laws. The incident had taken place in the Kirulapone area while attempting to obtain the Rs. 5000 allowance. He was produced to the court by Kirulapone police.

Accident
In March 2021, Karu fell at his home and no one noticed for several hours. Neighbors rushed him to hospital after they saw the water continue to flow in the bathroom for a long time. He then received treatment at Ward 43 of the Colombo General Hospital. A Bodhi Pooja for a speedy recovery was held at the Bellanwila Temple on 21 March 2021.

Filmography and stunt coordination
 No. denotes the Number of Sri Lankan film in the Sri Lankan cinema.

References

External links
 Wilson Karunarathne on Sinhala Cinema Database
 Duplicate is no Duplicate
 PEO TV launches “HELAWOOD POPCORN” blog creating a new virtual space for our cinema

1942 births
2022 deaths
Sri Lankan male film actors
Sinhalese male actors
Stunt performers
People from Colombo